The Britton Mims Place, located in North Augusta, South Carolina, exemplifies the Greek Revival style typical of secondary country residences during the antebellum period. Built around 1830, it is historically significant due to a number of architectural features, including its gabled roof, full width front verandah with hipped roof, and a number of outbuildings, including a (former) kitchen, wooden dog house, and a rectangular fowl house. This well-secluded home is not visible from the public highway. The Britton Mims Place was listed in the National Register of Historic Places on June 4, 1997.

References

Houses on the National Register of Historic Places in South Carolina
Greek Revival houses in South Carolina
Houses completed in 1840
Houses in Aiken County, South Carolina
National Register of Historic Places in Aiken County, South Carolina
North Augusta, South Carolina